Donegall Square is a square in the centre of Belfast, County Antrim, Northern Ireland. In the centre is Belfast City Hall, the headquarters of Belfast City Council. Each side of the square is named according to its geographical location, i.e. Donegall Square North, South, East and West. It is named after the Donegall family. Other streets to bear their name in Belfast are Donegall Road, Donegall Pass and Donegall Street. Donegall Place, the city's main shopping street, runs from the north side of the square. 

On the square are many banks or society branches, including HSBC, Nationwide, Irish Nationwide, Santander, Bank of Scotland, Halifax, Co-operative Bank, First Trust Bank, Bank of Ireland, Danske Bank and Ulster Bank. Many of the above have their Northern Ireland headquarters on the square. The Northern Bank robbery occurred at the bank's headquarters on Donegall Square West. In addition, it is the home to many leading Law Firms including; Millar McCall & Wylie, Sullivans, Rice & Company, McGriggors LLP, and Ferguson Solicitors.

Notable buildings on the square include the Linen Hall Library and the Scottish Provident Building, now a five-star serviced office business centre. The Ten Square Hotel on Donegall Square South was originally a Victorian linen warehouse. Its exterior features carved portholes, with the faces of George Washington, Sir Isaac Newton, Michelangelo and William Shakespeare protruding.

References

Streets in Belfast